Birrieria PDX is a Mexican restaurant in Portland, Oregon.

Description and history

The original Birrieria PDX operates from a red food cart on Division Street in southeast Portland's Centennial neighborhood, serving Mexican cuisine such as birria (including birria tacos and "birriamen", or ramen with birria), quesabirria, rice, beans, shredded meat, horchata, and agua frescas. The Plaza Plate includes a quesadilla, taco, mulita, tostada, and cup of consommé.

The family-owned restaurant opened in August 2020. Spouses Daniel Miranda and Lorena Brambila are co-owners with his sister Grecya Miranda her husband Ivan Uc. Since then, the business has expanded; there are four food carts in Portland, as of 2022.

Reception

In 2021, Zoe Baillargeon included the Birria Crunch Wrap in Eater Portland overview of "Where to Find the Cheesiest Dishes in Portland and Beyond", writing: 

Additionally, the website's Alex Frane described the crunch wrap as "sheer indulgence". He and Ron Scott included the Birria en Caldo in a 2021 list of "Portland's Most Potent Hangover Cures".

Eater Portland Brooke Jackson-Glidden included the Birria en Caldo in a 2022 list of "17 Sick Day Delivery Standbys to Order in Portland". She wrote, "when feeling under the weather, it's best to stay simple: the birria en caldo is just a tub of the braised beef in its rich broth, with a side of rice and tortillas. Those looking for some sinus-clearing can add a side of the hot salsa, to pour over rice or directly in the soup (not that it needs it)." The website's Katrina Yentch and other staffers also included Birrieria PDX in a list of "22 Go-to Spots for Affordable Dining in Portland".

See also

 Hispanics and Latinos in Portland, Oregon
 List of Mexican restaurants

References

External links

 

2020 establishments in Oregon
Food carts in Portland, Oregon
Mexican restaurants in Portland, Oregon
Restaurants established in 2020
Southeast Portland, Oregon